
Strzelce-Drezdenko County is a unit of territorial administration and local government (powiat) in Lubusz Voivodeship, western Poland. It came into being on January 1, 1999, as a result of the Polish local government reforms passed in 1998.

As of 2019 its total population is 49,156, out of which the population of Drezdenko is 10,122, that of Strzelce Krajeńskie is 9,950, that of Dobiegniew is 3,061, and the rural population is 26,023.

Neighbouring counties
Strzelce-Drezdenko County is bordered by Choszczno County to the north, Wałcz County to the north-east, Czarnków-Trzcianka County to the east, Międzychód County to the south-east, Międzyrzecz County to the south, Gorzów County to the south-west and Myślibórz County to the west.

Administrative division
The county is subdivided into five gminas (three urban-rural and two rural). These are listed in the following table, in descending order of population.

References

 
Strzelce-Drezdenko